Rosslyn Castle railway station served the village of Roslin, Midlothian, Scotland from 1872 to 1959 on the Penicuik Railway.

History 
The station opened as Rosslyn on 2 September 1872 by the Penicuik Railway. It was situated on both sides of an unnamed minor road. The platform ran under the road bridge with two-thirds of the platform on the east side and the other third on the west side. The station's name was changed to Rosslyn Castle on 16 February 1874. This name was set in small stones as an ornamental feature. The goods yard was on the west side of the road bridge. It had three sidings, two being short and one serving a loading dock. The third siding was longer and ran parallel with the line for 300 yards to a transhipment point. The station closed to passengers on 10 September 1951 but remained open to goods traffic. By 1958 two of the sidings had been lifted, leaving only the loading dock siding in use. The station closed completely on 3 August 1959.

References

External links 

Disused railway stations in Midlothian
Former North British Railway stations
Railway stations in Great Britain opened in 1872
Railway stations in Great Britain closed in 1951
1872 establishments in Scotland